A Christmas Celebration is a studio album by American singer Gladys Knight along with the Saints Unified Voices music choir. It was released by Many Roads Records on October 3, 2006 in the United States.

Critical reception
Allmusic editor Alex Henderson found that "Knight presents a warm, welcoming set of Yuletide songs on 2006's A Christmas Celebration. A showcase for the choir Saints Unified Voices (an ensemble assembled and directed by Knight), A Christmas Celebration finds the group backed by light, Quiet Storm-style arrangements on serene versions of both secular and religious classics."

Track listing

Charts

Release history

References 

Gladys Knight albums
2006 Christmas albums